Din Ratrir Golpo  is a 2020 Indian Bengali language space fiction film directed by Prosenjit Choudhury and produced by Supriti Choudhury. It stars Supriti Choudhury, Rajatava Dutta, Pradip Mukherjee, Rukmini Chatterjee, Sourav Chatterjee and Rayati Bhattacheryee. The film was released theatrically on 28 February 2020.

Cast
 Supriti Choudhury
 Rajatava Dutta
 Pradip Mukherjee
 Rukmini Chatterjee
 Sourav Chatterjee
 Rayati Bhattacheryee

Promotion and release

The official trailer of the film was launched by producers on 10 January 2020.

The film was released theatrically on 28 February 2020.

References

2020 films
Bengali-language Indian films
Indian science fiction horror films
2020 science fiction horror films
2020s Bengali-language films